Lissy Arna (born Elisabeth Arndt, 20 December 1900 – 22 January 1964) was a German film actress. She appeared in 63 films between 1918 and 1962. She starred in the 1931 film The Squeaker, which was directed by Martin Frič and Karel Lamač. She entered U.S. films in 1930 under the direction of William Dieterle, appearing in German-language versions of American films.

Partial filmography

 Aus dem Schwarzbuch eines Polizeikommissars, 2. Teil: Verbrechen aus Leidenschaft (1921)
 A Night's Adventure (1923)
 The Elegant Bunch (1925) - Erna Kallweit
 The Woman without Money (1925)
 Adventure on the Night Express (1925) - Gräfin Sonja Waranow
 Die Tugendprobe. Eine lustige Begebenheit von der Waterkant (1926)
 Darling, Count the Cash (1926) - Boxerbraut
 The Queen of the Baths (1926) - Mannequin
 I Liked Kissing Women (1926) - Sybill Malva, Kokotte
 Wenn Menschen irren. Frauen auf Irrwegen (1926)
 The Villa in Tiergarten Park (1927) - Po-Gri, Etvilles Freundin
 When the Young Wine Blossoms (1927)
 The Catwalk (1927) - Regine - Hackelbergs Tochter
 The Bordello in Rio (1927) - Josepha, Alfredos Frau
 The Eleven Devils (1927) - Vivien
 The Famous Woman (1927) - Sonja Litowskaja
 Weekend Magic (1927) - Marcella Ferrari
 Tough Guys, Easy Girls (1927) - Adele, ein leichtes Mädchen
 One Plus One Equals Three (1927)
 The Prince of Rogues (1928) - Julchen Blasius
 The Physician (1928) - Jessie Gurdon
 Eva in Silk (1928) - Helene Hain
 Under the Lantern (1928) - Else Riedel
 Lemke's Widow (1928)
 Children of the Street (1929)
 The Triumph of the Heart (1929) - Märta Tamm
 Beyond the Street (1929) - Die Dirne / The Prostitute
 Poison Gas (1929) - Ellen
 Prisoner Number Seven (1929) - Rabnõ
 The Dance Goes On (1930) - Elly
 The Mask Falls (1931)
 Demon of the Sea (1931)
 Beyond Victory (1931) - Katherina
 Seine Freundin Annette (1931) - Annette Rollan
 The Squeaker (1931) - Lillie / Millie Trent
 Um eine Nasenlänge (1931) - Filmstar, der den Startschuß abgibt
 The Soaring Maiden (1931) - Sonja, Detektivin
 The Unfaithful Eckehart (1931) - Ärztin Fräulein Dr. Drewello
 Mountains on Fire (1931) - Pia, seine Frau
 Der schönste Mann im Staate (1932) - Herta, seine Tochter
 Vater geht auf Reisen (1932) - Anna, Braut von Panicke
 Transit Camp (1932)
 Theodor Körner (1932) - Eleonore v. Prohaska
 Kind, ich freu’ mich auf Dein Kommen (1933) - Lu Thiemann - Fotografin
  (1933) - Lissy Verhagen
 Inge and the Millions (1933) - Kitty, Freundin von Conrady
 ...heute abend bei mir (1934) - Wanja Perescu
 What Am I Without You (1934) - Herself
 Men Without a Fatherland (1937) - Mila Wentos
 His Best Friend (1937) - Frau Woerden, Pensionsinhaberin
 To New Shores (1937) - Gefangene Nelly
 The Yellow Flag (1937) - Halbweltdame Pandorita
 Morgen werde ich verhaftet (1939) - Sängerin Giannina Belloni
 Hochzeit mit Hindernissen (1939) - Eugenie Draxler, Rentnerin
 Sensationsprozess Casilla (1939) - Ines Brown
 Life Begins at Eight (1962)

References

External links
 

1900 births
1964 deaths
German film actresses
German silent film actresses
Actresses from Berlin
20th-century German actresses